Markus Baur (born 22 January 1971) is a former German handball player now turned trainer. He is considered one of the world's best players on his position.

Born in Meersburg, he is a member of the German national handball team since 1994, making his debut against the Moroccan national handball team on 4 August in Balingen. The German handball player of the years 2000 and 2002, he won the 2004 European Men's Handball Championship and the 2007 World Men's Handball Championship. As of January 2007, he has made 200 international matches with 615 goals.

In the Bundesliga Baur played for SG Wallau-Massenheim from 1993 to 1997, between 1997 and 1998 for TV Niederwürzbach and from 1998 to 2001 for HSG Wetzlar. Since 2001, he plays for TBV Lemgo, winning the National Championship of Germany with his team in 2003 and the EHF Cup in 2006. In 1994 and 2002, he has also won the National Cup of Germany.

Personal life
Baur is married and has three children; one daughter Chiara who plays handball, and two sons who play football named Mika and Kimi.

References

 

1971 births
Living people
People from Bodenseekreis
Sportspeople from Tübingen (region)
German male handball players
Olympic handball players of Germany
Handball players at the 1996 Summer Olympics
Handball players at the 2000 Summer Olympics
Handball players at the 2004 Summer Olympics
Olympic silver medalists for Germany
Olympic medalists in handball
HSG Wetzlar players
Medalists at the 2004 Summer Olympics